The Australasian Oaks, is a South Australian Jockey Club Group 1 Thoroughbred horse race for three-year-old fillies at Set Weights run over a distance of 2000 metres at Morphettville Racecourse, Adelaide, Australia in the SAJC Autumn Carnival.  Prize money is A$502,250.

History
The inaugural race was won by Rose Of Kingston who went on to become the Australian Horse of the Year and finished her racing career with ten wins including three Group 1 races that included the Australian Derby. She was also the Australasian Champion Three-Year-Old Filly and Australasian Champion Older Mare in 1982 and later was a successful broodmare.

Name
1982–2005 - Australasian Oaks
2006 onwards - Schweppes Oaks

Grade
1982 - Grade 3
1983 onwards - Grade 1

Distance
The distance of the race is 2000 metres, but due to the track conditions the running rail is sometimes moved and this changes the official distance of the race.

1982–1992 - 2000 metres
1993 - 2014 metres
1994–2000 - 2000 metres
2001 - 2020 metres
2002 - 2000 metres
2003 - 2025 metres
2004 - 2024 metres
2005 - 2031 metres
2006 - 2020 metres
2007–2008 - 2000 metres
2009 - 2005 metres
2010 - 2006 metres
2011 - 2008 metres
2012–2016 - 2000 metres
2017 - 2010 metres

Venue

The race was run in 2000 at Victoria Park.

Records

The 2007 winner Anamato holds the race record time of 2:02.20.

Most wins by a trainer: 4
Bart Cummings – 1983, 1989, 1993, 1994
Lee Freedman – 1986, 1991, 1992, 2000

Winners

 2022 - Glint Of Hope
 2021 - Media Award
 2020 - Toffee Tongue
 2019 - Princess Jenni
 2018 - Sopressa
 2017 - Egg Tart
 2016 - Abbey Marie
 2015 - Delicacy
 2014 - May's Dream
 2013 - Maybe Discreet
 2012 - Invest
 2011 - Lights Of Heavon
 2010 - Small Minds
 2009 - Gallica
 2008 - Zarita
 2007 - Anamato
 2006 - Marju Snip
 2005 - Irish Darling
 2004 - Rinky Dink
 2003 - Sound Action
 2002 - Tully Thunder
 2001 - Tempest Morn
 2000 - Grand Echezeaux
 1999 - Episode
 1998 - La Volta
 1997 - Minegold
 1996 - Leica Smile
 1995 - Yelgun Dawn
 1994 - Tristalove
 1993 - Our Tristalight
 1992 - Gatherneaux
 1991 - Mannerism
 1990 - Belle Chanson
 1989 - Stapleton Lass
 1988 - Imposera
 1987 - Send Me An Angel
 1986 - Miss Clipper
 1985 - Centaurea
 1984 - Use The Space
 1983 - Royal Regatta
 1982 - Rose Of Kingston

See also
 List of Australian Group races
 Group races

References

Group 1 stakes races in Australia
Flat horse races for three-year-old fillies
Sport in Adelaide